Classe may refer to:

 Classe, ancient port of Ravenna, Italy
 Basilica of Sant'Apollinare in Classe, a 6th-century church in Ravenna
 Classé, a Canadian manufacturer of audio equipment
 Coalition large de l'association pour une solidarité syndicale étudiante (CLASSE), Canadian student union